This is a list of Juventus F.C. honours. Juventus F.C. is an Italian football club. This article contains historical and current trophies pertaining to the club. For honours by season, see List of Juventus F.C. seasons.

National titles (60) 
 Serie A
 Winners (36): 1905, 1925–26, 1930–31, 1931–32, 1932–33, 1933–34, 1934–35, 1949–50, 1951–52, 1957–58, 1959–60, 1960–61, 1966–67, 1971–72, 1972–73, 1974–75, 1976–77, 1977–78, 1980–81, 1981–82, 1983–84, 1985–86, 1994–95, 1996–97, 1997–98, 2001–02, 2002–03, 2004–05, 2005–06, 2011–12, 2012–13, 2013–14, 2014–15, 2015–16, 2016–17, 2017–18, 2018–19, 2019–20
 Runners-up (21): 1903, 1904, 1906, 1937–38, 1945–46, 1946–47, 1947–48, 1952–53, 1953–54, 1962–63, 1973–74, 1975–76, 1979–80, 1982–83, 1986–87, 1991–92, 1993–94, 1995–96, 1999–2000, 2000–01, 2008–09
 Coppa Italia
 Winners (14): 1937–38, 1941–42, 1958–59, 1959–60, 1964–65, 1978–79, 1982–83, 1989–90, 1994–95, 2014–15, 2015–16, 2016–17, 2017–18, 2020–21
 Runners-up (7): 1972–73, 1991–92, 2001–02, 2003–04, 2011–12, 2019–20, 2021–22
 Supercoppa Italiana
 Winners (9): 1995, 1997, 2002, 2003, 2012, 2013, 2015, 2018, 2020
 Runners-up (8): 1990, 1998, 2005, 2014, 2016, 2017, 2019, 2021
 Serie B
 Winners (1): 2006–07

European titles (9) 

 European Champions' Cup/UEFA Champions League: 2
 Winners: 1984–85, 1995–96
Runners-up: 1972–73, 1982–83, 1996–97, 1997–98, 2002–03, 2014–15, 2016–17
 UEFA Cup Winners' Cup: 1
 Winners: 1983–84
 UEFA Europa League: 3
 Winners: 1976–77, 1989–90, 1992–93
Runners-up: 1994–95
 UEFA Super Cup: 2
 Winners: 1984, 1996
 UEFA Intertoto Cup: 1
 Winners: 1999
 Inter-Cities Fairs Cup:
Runners-up: 1964–65, 1970–71

 Worldwide titles (2) 
 Intercontinental Cup: 2Winners: 1985, 1996
Runners-up: 1973

 Friendly competitions (51) 
 National Department of Public Education Cup: (3) 1900, 1901, 1902
 Government of City of Torino's Gold Medal: (1) 1901
 City of Torino's Cup: (2) 1902, 1903
 Trino Vercellese's Tournament: (1) 1903
 International University Cup: (1) 1904
 Luigi Bozino Cup: (2) 1905, 1906
 Luserna San Giovanni Cup: (1) 1907
 Federal Championship of Prima Categoria (James R. Spensley's Cup) (1): 1908
 Palla d'Argento Henry Dapples: (2) both won in 1908
 Italian Championship of Prima Categoria (R. Buni's Cup) (1): 1909
 Biella Cup: (1) 1909
 FIAT Tournament: (1) 1945
 Pio Marchi Cup: (1) 1945
 Cup of the Alps: (1) 1963
 Italian-Spanish Friendship's Cup: (1) 1965
 Coppa Super Clubs: (1) 1983
 Luigi Berlusconi Trophy: (11) 1991, 1995, 1998, 1999, 2000, 2001, 2003, 2004, 2010, 2012, 2021
 Pier Cesare Baretti Memorial: (2) 1992, 1993
 Sivori Cup: (1) 1994
 Birra Moretti Trophy: (6) 1997, 2000, 2003, 2004, 2006, 2008
 Republic of San Marino Trophy: (3) 1998, 2001, 2002
 Trofeo Valle d'Aosta: (3) 2001, 2002, 2003
 Joan Gamper Trophy: (1) 2005
 TIM Trophy: (1) 2009
 International Champions Cup: (1) Australia 2016

 MLS All-Star Game: (1)'''
 2018

Notes

References

External links 
 Juventus Trophy Room
 Juventus F.C.

Honours